The 1982 Tour de France was the 69th edition of Tour de France, one of cycling's Grand Tours. The Tour began in Basel, Switzerland with a prologue individual time trial on 2 July and Stage 11 occurred on 14 July with an individual time trial from Valence d'Agen. The race finished on the Champs-Élysées in Paris on 25 July.

Stage 11
14 July 1982 — Valence d'Agen,  (individual time trial)

Stage 12
15 July 1982 — Fleurance to Pau,

Stage 13
16 July 1982 — Pau to Saint-Lary-Soulan Pla d'Adet,

Stage 14
18 July 1982 — Martigues,  (individual time trial)

Stage 15
19 July 1982 — Manosque to Orcières-Merlette,

Stage 16
20 July 1982 — Orcières-Merlette to Alpe d'Huez,

Stage 17
21 July 1982 — Le Bourg-d'Oisans to Morzine,

Stage 18
22 July 1982 — Morzine to Saint-Priest,

Stage 19
23 July 1982 — Saint-Priest,  (individual time trial)

Stage 20
24 July 1982 — Sens to Aulnay-sous-Bois,

Stage 21
25 July 1982 — Fontenay-sous-Bois to Paris Champs-Élysées,

References

1982 Tour de France
Tour de France stages